Harold M. Brathwaite Secondary School is a public high school located in Brampton, Ontario, Canada.

History 
The school is named after Harold M. Brathwaite (d.2020), a former Director of Education of the Peel District School Board, who retired in 2003, which is also when the school opened. The school strives to assist its students in developing their competencies academically, technically and professionally. The school promotes unity in a diverse society. Harold M. Brathwaite proves a multitude of opportunities for students to grow and reach their goals. It has had a number of successful alumni. The school will continue to support its motto of "Dream, Believe, Succeed", as it is a driving factor for many students. The school is commonly referred to by its abbreviated name, HB. The sports teams are known as the Brathwaite Blizzard.

Highlights 
Site of OISE/University of Toronto student teacher education programme
SHSM - Specialist High Skills Major Program in both Business and Law: This program caters to students who wish to pursue a career in the specified fields of business and law. To achieve the designation, students must follow through with a comprehensive itinerary of courses, which also requires them to serve one term in a co-op position.
IB Diploma Program- a rigorous pre-university program leading to assessments in six subject areas. IB offers a challenging curriculum, taught by accredited IB teachers. The program is noted for its depth and its international perspective. The IB Diploma provides a coherent and demanding educational experience across the full curriculum and requires IB students to engage in community service, individual research, and an inquiry into the nature of knowledge.

Clubs and extracurriculars
Students are encouraged to get involved in the many clubs and teams available at Harold M. Brathwaite Secondary School. Extra-curricular activities include athletics such as archery, basketball, cricket, rugby, ball hockey, cross country, volleyball, soccer, football, badminton, track and field, table tennis, as well as clubs including, Student Activity Council (SAC), DECA, HOSA, Model UN, Human Impact, Ecology Club, Yearbook Committee, Zonta Club, The Voice (school newspaper), Robotics (FRC), MSA, as well as a Concert Band.

Notable alumni
Anthony Bennett - basketball player

See also
List of high schools in Ontario

References

External links 

Harold M. Brathwaite Secondary School at Peel District School Board
Harold M. Brathwaite Secondary School at the Ontario Ministry of Education
Harold M. Brathwaite Secondary School

Peel District School Board
High schools in Brampton
Educational institutions established in 2003
2003 establishments in Ontario
International Baccalaureate schools in Ontario